Sheridan Bluff is an Antarctic bluff at the south side of the junction of Poulter Glacier and Scott Glacier, 2 miles (3.2 km) east-southeast of Mount Saltonstall, in the Queen Maud Mountains. Mapped by United States Geological Survey (USGS) from surveys and U.S. Navy aerial photographs, 1960–64. Named by Advisory Committee on Antarctic Names (US-ACAN) after Michael F. Sheridan, Professor of Geology, Arizona State University, a member of a United States Antarctic Research Program (USARP) field party in this area during the 1978–79 season.

References

Queen Maud Mountains
Cliffs of the Ross Dependency
Amundsen Coast